The canton of Les Trois Monts is an administrative division of the Charente-Maritime department, western France. It was created at the French canton reorganisation which came into effect in March 2015. Its seat is in Montendre.

It consists of the following communes:

La Barde
Bedenac
Boresse-et-Martron
Boscamnant
Bran
Bussac-Forêt
Cercoux
Chamouillac
Chartuzac
Chatenet
Chepniers
Chevanceaux
Clérac
La Clotte
Corignac
Coux
Expiremont
Le Fouilloux
La Genétouze
Jussas
Mérignac 
Messac
Montendre
Montguyon
Montlieu-la-Garde
Neuvicq
Orignolles
Le Pin
Polignac
Pommiers-Moulons
Pouillac
Rouffignac
Saint-Aigulin
Sainte-Colombe
Saint-Martin-d'Ary
Saint-Martin-de-Coux
Saint-Palais-de-Négrignac
Saint-Pierre-du-Palais
Souméras
Sousmoulins
Tugéras-Saint-Maurice
Vanzac

References

Cantons of Charente-Maritime